Going to Pieces: The Rise and Fall of the Slasher Film is a 2006 documentary film about slasher films. It makes reference to many popular horror and thriller films as well.

Synopsis
The film is a historical and critical look at slasher films, which includes dozens of clips, beginning with Halloween, Friday the 13th, and Prom Night. The films' directors, writers, producers, and special effects creators comment on the films' making and success. During the Ronald Reagan years, the films get gorier, budgets get smaller, and their appeal diminishes. Then, A Nightmare on Elm Street revives the genre. Jumping to the late 1990s, when Scream brings humor and TV stars into the mix. Although some criticize the genre as misogynistic, most of the talking heads celebrate the films: as long as there are teenagers, there will be slasher films.

Movie references

 Alone in the Dark (1982)
April Fool's Day (1986)
Black Christmas (1974)
Bay of Blood/Twitch of the Death Nerve (1971)
The Boogeyman (1980)
Christmas Evil (1980)
 Don't Answer the Phone (1980)
Don't Open Till Christmas (1984)
 Freddy Vs. Jason (2003)
Friday the 13th (1980)
Friday the 13th Part II (1981)
Friday the 13th Part III (1982)
Friday the 13th: The Final Chapter (1984)
Graduation Day (1981)
Halloween (1978)
 Halloween II (1981)
Happy Birthday to Me (1981)
He Knows You're Alone (1980)
 Hostel (2005)
 House of 1000 Corpses (2003)
I Know What You Did Last Summer (1997)
 Intruder (1989)
Just Before Dawn (1981)
The Last House on the Left (1972)
Maniac (1980)
Mother's Day (1980)
My Bloody Valentine (1981)
New Year's Evil (1980)
A Nightmare on Elm Street (1984)
Peeping Tom (1960)
Pieces (1982)
Prom Night (1980)
The Prowler (1981)
Psycho (1960)
Saturday the 14th (1981)
Saw (2004)
Scream (1996)
Silent Night, Deadly Night (1984)
Sleepaway Camp (1983)
 Suspiria (1977)
Terror Train (1980)
 The Burning (1981)
 The Devil's Rejects (2005)
 The Hills Have Eyes (1977)
 The House on Sorority Row (1983)
 The Slumber Party Massacre (1982)
The Texas Chain Saw Massacre (1974)
 Urban Legend (1998)
 When A Stranger Calls (2006)
 Wolf Creek (2005)

Interviews

 Christa Campbell
 John Carpenter
 Lilyan Chauvin
 Wes Craven
 Sean S. Cunningham
 John Dunning
 Amy Holden Jones
 Jeff Katz
 Paul Lynch
 Harry Manfredini
 Armand Mastroianni
 Gregory Nicotero
 Robert Oppenheimer
 Betsy Palmer
 Felissa Rose
 Tom Savini
 Robert Shaye
 Joseph Stefano
 Natasha Talonz
 Anthony Timpone
 Fred Walton
 Stan Winston
 Joseph Zito
 Rob Zombie

Production 
The documentary film based on Adam Rockoff's book Going to Pieces: The Rise and Fall of the Slasher Film, 1978-1986, which was released 2002 over the McFarland & Company.

See also
Slice and Dice: The Slasher Film Forever

Notes

External links
 

2006 films
2006 documentary films
American documentary films
Documentary films about horror
Films scored by Harry Manfredini
American slasher films
2000s English-language films
2000s American films